The 5th constituency of Indre-et-Loire is one of five French legislative constituencies in the Indre-et-Loire département.

It consists of the North-West of Tours, the
Canton of Langeais and Canton of Saint-Cyr-sur-Loire and the
communes Neuillé-Pont-Pierre and Neuvy-le-Roi.

Deputies

Election Results

2022

 
 
|-
| colspan="8" bgcolor="#E9E9E9"|
|-

2017

2012

References

5